Aspidorhynchus (from   'shield' and   'snout') is an extinct genus of ray-finned fish from the Jurassic and Cretaceous periods. Fossils have been found in Europe and Antarctica.
 
It also had heavy scales and a symmetrical tail. The upper jaw was longer than the lower jaw, ending in a toothless spike. Although it would have looked superficially similar to the present day gars, it was not related to them, belonging to the Aspidorhynchiformes, an extinct group of fish noted for their elongated rostrums. Aspidorhynchiformes are generally considered early relatives of teleosts.

Ecology

Several limestone slabs have been discovered in which fossils of Rhamphorhynchus are found in close association with Aspidorhynchus. In one of these specimens, the jaws of an Aspidorhynchus pass through the wings of the Rhamphorhynchus specimen. The Rhamphorhynchus also has the remains of a small fish, possibly Leptolepides, in its throat. This slab, cataloged as WDC CSG 255, may represent two levels of predation; one by Rhamphorhynchus and one by Aspidorhynchus. In a 2012 description of WDC CSG 255, researchers proposed that the Rhamphorhynchus individual had just caught a Leptolepides while it was flying low over a body of water. As the Leptolepides was travelling down its pharynx, a large Aspidorhynchus would have attacked from below the water, puncturing the left wing membrane of the Rhamphorhynchus with its sharp rostrum. The teeth in its snout were ensnared in the fibrous tissue of the wing membrane, and as the fish thrashed to release itself the left wing of the Rhamphorhynchus was pulled backward into the distorted position seen in the fossil. The encounter resulted in the death of both individuals, most likely because the two animals sank into an anoxic layer in the water body, depriving the fish of oxygen. The two may have been preserved together as the weight of the head of the Aspidorhynchus held down the much lighter body of the Rhamphorhynchus.

References

Prehistoric fish of Antarctica
Prehistoric ray-finned fish genera
Middle Jurassic bony fish
Late Jurassic bony fish
Cretaceous bony fish
Middle Jurassic fish of Europe
Late Jurassic fish of Europe
Cretaceous fish of Europe
Fossil taxa described in 1833 
Taxa named by Louis Agassiz